New York, New York is a 1977 American musical drama film directed by Martin Scorsese and written by Mardik Martin and Earl Mac Rauch based on a story by Rauch. It is a musical tribute, featuring new songs by John Kander and Fred Ebb as well as jazz standards, to Scorsese's home town of New York City, and stars Liza Minnelli and Robert De Niro as a pair of musicians and lovers. The story is "about a jazz saxophonist (De Niro) and a pop singer (Minnelli) who fall madly in love and marry;" however, the "saxophonist's outrageously volatile personality places a continual strain on their relationship, and after they have a baby, their marriage crumbles," even as their careers develop on separate paths. The film marked the final screen appearance of actor Jack Haley.

Plot
On V-J Day in 1945, a massive celebration in a New York City nightclub is underway, music provided by the Tommy Dorsey Orchestra. While there, selfish and smooth-talking saxophone player Jimmy Doyle (De Niro) meets small-time USO singer Francine Evans (Minnelli), who, although lonely, still wants nothing to do with Jimmy, who keeps pestering her for her phone number.

The next morning, they end up sharing a cab, and, against her will, Francine accompanies Jimmy to an audition. There he gets into an argument with the club owner. Francine, to get the audition back on track, begins to sing the old standard, "You Brought a New Kind of Love to Me"; Jimmy joins in on his sax. The club owner is impressed and, to Francine's astonishment, they are both offered a job—as a traveling boy-girl act. From that moment on, Jimmy and Francine's relationship deepens into a mix of obsession and love. But there are problems—mainly, Jimmy's tendency to fight with his co-workers, overly dramatic behavior, and his increasingly violent arguments with Francine, who becomes pregnant with his child. An especially bad shouting match between them results in Francine going into labor. Jimmy rushes her to the hospital, where she delivers a baby boy. But Jimmy is not ready to be a father, or a good husband, and he abandons his wife, declining even to see his newborn son as he leaves the hospital.

Several years later, in a recording studio, Francine records "But the World Goes Round," a powerful anthem which makes the charts and turns her into a popular entertainment figure. In the years that follow, Jimmy and Francine both find success in the music industry; he becomes a renowned jazz musician and club owner, while she becomes a successful singer and film actress.

Jimmy records a song of his on his saxophone which tops the jazz charts, and Francine cements her stardom after singing that same song, "New York, New York," for which she has provided the lyrics. Her performance, received by a wildly appreciative audience, takes place in the same nightclub where, years earlier, she and Jimmy had met. After the show, Jimmy telephones his ex-wife, suggesting they get together for dinner. Francine is tempted, heads toward the stage door exit, but at the last moment changes her mind. Jimmy, waiting on the sidewalk, realizes he has been stood up and heads off down the street, accompanied by the song he has written—the "Theme from New York, New York.

Cast

Music

 "Main Title" (Theme / You Are My Lucky Star / Just You, Just Me / The Man I Love - Medley) - Ralph Burns (1:53)
 "You Brought a New Kind of Love to Me" - Liza Minnelli (1:47)
 "Flip the Dip" - orchestra (2:13)
 "V.J. Stomp" - orchestra (1:08)
 "Opus Number One" - orchestra (8:49)
 "Once in a While" - Liza Minnelli (2:17)
 "You Are My Lucky Star" - Liza Minnelli (1:18)
 "Game Over" - orchestra (2:25)
 "It's a Wonderful World" - orchestra (2:08)
 "The Man I Love" - Liza Minnelli (3:20)
 "Hazoy" - orchestra (2:38)
 "Just You, Just Me" - Liza Minnelli (2:29)
 "There Goes the Ball Game" - Liza Minnelli (1:27)
 "Blue Moon" - Robert De Niro / Mary Kay Place (3:28)
 "Don't Be That Way" - orchestra (0:44)
 "Happy Endings" - Liza Minnelli / Larry Kert (11:39)
 "But the World Goes 'Round" - Liza Minnelli (3:58)
 "Theme from New York, New York" - orchestra (2:49)
 "Honeysuckle Rose" - Diahnne Abbott (2:16)
 "Once Again Right Away" - orchestra (2:04)
 "Bobby's Dream" - orchestra (3:58)
 "Theme from New York, New York" - Liza Minnelli (3:16)
 "Theme from New York, New York (Reprise)" - Orchestra (1:13)

The theme song of the film, "Theme from New York, New York, found its own success when Frank Sinatra recorded a cover version of it in 1979. The song became a hit, and both Sinatra's and Minnelli's versions have become closely associated with Manhattan in New York City. Minnelli continues to perform the number at nearly all of her concerts.

Charts

Reception

Box office
Made after Scorsese's successful Taxi Driver, the film was a box-office failure. Its budget was $14 million, a large figure at the time, and it grossed only $16.4 million at the box office. The disappointing reception drove Scorsese into depression and drugs. In Peter Biskind's book Easy Riders, Raging Bulls it is reported that Scorsese's addiction to cocaine and complete lack of control over the improvisation of dialogue on the set were major factors that contributed to the failure of the film. United Artists ultimately recouped its loss on the film as a result of an agreement wherein they would share the profits with Rocky, which the executives had expected to be a flop.

In his introduction to the film's DVD, released in 2005, Scorsese explains that he intended the film as a break from the gritty realism for which he had become famous, and sees it as an homage to the musical films of Classical Hollywood. For this reason, he designed the film's sets and storyline to be deliberately artificial-looking. He acknowledges that it is an experiment that did not please everyone.

Critical response
On Rotten Tomatoes the film has an approval rating of 57% based on 46 reviews. The critical consensus reads, "Martin Scorsese's technical virtuosity and Liza Minnelli's magnetic presence are on full display in New York, New York, although this ambitious musical's blend of swooning style and hard-bitten realism makes for a queasy mixture." Time reviewer Christopher Porterfield stated that "If this movie were a big-band arrangement, it would be a duet for a sax man and a girl singer, but with the soloists in a different key from the band." Critic Dave Kehr from the Chicago Reader wrote that "Scorsese created a very handsome and dynamic film, but the spectacular set pieces don't add up to much." Variety'''s uncredited reviewer stated that in "a final burst from Old Hollywood, Minnelli tears into the title song and it's a wowser." Reviewer Geoff Andrew from Time Out states that "Scorsese's tribute/parody/critique of the MGM musical is a razor-sharp dissection of the conventions of both meeting-cute romances and rags-to-riches biopics." Reviewer Vincent Canby from The New York Times questioned, "Why should a man of Mr. Scorsese's talent be giving us what amounts to no more than a film buff's essay on a pop-film form that was never, at any point in film history, of the first freshness?" Critic Roger Ebert from the Chicago Sun-Times writes that "Scorsese's New York, New York never pulls itself together into a coherent whole, but if we forgive the movie its confusions we're left with a good time."

Accolades
The film is recognized by American Film Institute in these lists:

 2004: AFI's 100 Years...100 Songs:
 "Theme from New York, New York – #31
 2006: AFI's Greatest Movie Musicals – Nominated

Golden Globe Awards
Nominations
 Best Original Song: "New York, New York''" by Fred Ebb and John Kander
 Best Motion Picture – Musical or Comedy
 Best Actress – Motion Picture Musical or Comedy: Liza Minnelli
 Best Actor – Motion Picture Musical or Comedy: Robert De Niro

Re-releases
When the film was originally released, it had a running time of 155 minutes. The box-office failure of the film prompted United Artists to cut the film down to 136 minutes. It was then re-released in 1981 with the deleted scenes restored, including the lengthy musical number "Happy Endings", only a small portion of which had appeared in the original release. The total running time of the DVD edition is 163 minutes.

Stage adaptation
In 2023, a stage adaptation will premiere on Broadway with music by Kander, lyrics by Kander, Ebb, and Lin-Manuel Miranda and direction and choreography by Susan Stroman.

See also 
New York, New York (musical)

References

External links

 
 
 
 
 

1977 films
1977 romantic drama films
1970s American films
1970s English-language films
1970s musical drama films
American musical drama films
American romantic drama films
American romantic musical films
American World War II films
Films about music and musicians
Films about race and ethnicity
Films directed by Martin Scorsese
Films produced by Irwin Winkler
Films produced by Robert Chartoff
Films set in 1945
Films set in New York City
Films shot in Los Angeles
Films shot in New York City
Jazz films
Liza Minnelli soundtracks
Metafictional works
United Artists films